Cardinal Newman Catholic School is a coeducational Roman Catholic secondary school and sixth form located in the Keresley area of Coventry, West Midlands, England. It is part of the Holy Cross Catholic MAC (HCCMAC).

Feeder primary schools
Christ The King, Coundon
Holy Family, Holbrooks
St Augustine's, Radford
St Elizabeth's, Foleshill
St Osburg's, Coundon

Notable former students
 Declan Bennett, singer and actor
 Daniel Crowley, footballer for Arsenal F.C.
 Michael Quirke, professional footballer  
 Matt Taylor, weather forecaster
 Liam Watts, musician member of The Enemy

References

Secondary schools in Coventry
Catholic secondary schools in the Archdiocese of Birmingham
Educational institutions established in 1969
1969 establishments in England
Academies in Coventry